The following are the national records in athletics in Tunisia maintained by Tunisia's national athletics federation: Fédération Tunisienne d'Athlétisme (FTA).

Outdoor

Key to tables:

+ = en route to a longer distance

h = hand timing

Wo = Women only race

Men

Women

Indoor

Men

Women

Notes

References
General
Tunisian Outdoor Records – Men 28 August 2019 updated
Tunisian Outdoor Records – Women 27 August 2019 updated
Tunisian Indoor Records 7 December 2019 updated
Specific

External links
FTA official website

Tunisia
Records
Athletics
Athletics